KASE-FM (100.7 MHz "KASE 101") is a commercial radio station licensed to Austin, Texas.  It is owned by iHeartMedia and airs a country music radio format.  It shares studios and offices with four sister stations in the Penn Field complex in the South Congress district (or "SoCo") of south central Austin within walking distance of St. Edward's University.  The transmitter site is off Waymaker Way in Austin, amid towers for other FM and TV stations.

KASE-FM broadcasts in the HD Radio format.  It airs alternative rock on its HD2 subchannel, branded as "Alt 97.5," which is also carried on translator station K248CU on 97.5 MHz in Austin.  KASE-FM and K248CU can also be heard on the iHeartRadio platform.

Programming
Weekday mornings, The Bobby Bones Show from Nashville is heard on KASE-FM.  It is syndicated by Premiere Networks, a subsidiary of iHeartMedia.  On Saturday and Sunday mornings, KASE-FM features "The Best of Bobby Bones."  Overnight, KASE-FM carries After MidNite with Granger Smith.  The rest of the schedule is staffed by voice-tracked DJs from outside Austin.

In Austin, iHeartMedia owns two country stations.  98.1 KVET-FM plays of mix of current, recent and classic country, while KASE-FM concentrates on more contemporary country titles.

History

Beautiful music
KASE-FM first signed on the air on March 30, 1969, playing an automated beautiful music format.  It was co-owned with AM 1300 KVET, a popular AM country station.  KASE-FM transmitted with an effective radiated power of 26,500 watts, a quarter of its current power.

After a little over a decade on the air, management saw an opening for a new FM format in Austin.  While the AM station would continue to play an older, personality style of country and western music, KASE-FM was designed to appeal to younger country fans.

Switch to country
Bill Mayne, KASE Program director at the time, recalled in a 2010 interview, the Friday afternoon in September 1981 when KASE "came out of Mantovani and went into the Waylon Jennings song Are You Ready for the Country and had every dentist's office, nursing home and doctor's office in the city of Austin calling to complain."

The "Continuous Country" format became a hit with Austin listeners and has consistently been voted by radio general managers as one of the top twenty "Most Admired Stations" in America.  It was the first station to win the "Station of the Year" award from the Country Music Association four times and was given its second Billboard Magazine "Station of the Year" award in 1997.

In 1990, KVET (AM) began simulcasting on 98.1 MHz.  KASE continued to target adults in the 18-34 and 18-49 demographics, while KVET-FM targeted the 25-54 year old demographic.

Change in ownership
In 1998, KVET, Inc., which owned KVET-AM-FM and KASE-FM, sold its stations to Capstar, Inc.  Capstar was later merged into Clear Channel Communications, which is known today as iHeartMedia.

KVET and KASE have historically been Austin's top country stations, staving off many competitors over the decades.  KASE-FM has also been nominated for the Country Music Association (CMA) "Large Market Station of the Year" Award numerous times.

Personalities
Current:
The Bobby Bones Show, Anne Hudson, Alek Halverson, Aaron Michael, CMT After Midnight with Cody Alan

Former:
 Tom Allen
JT Bosch
 Erin Austin
 Deena Blake
 Bama Brown (Moved to sister station KVET-FM)
 Kid Callahan (Larry Durham)
 Mike Carta
 Cody
 Bob Cole
 Gary Dixon
 Gerry Harmon
 Michael Hart (as Rick Shaw)
 Keith Jacobs
 Amy James
 Chris Knight
 Julie K
 Matt Kaspar
 Troy Kimmel
 Rodney Lay, Jr.
 Michelle Lee
 Rachel Marisay
 Jamie Martin
 Rob Mason (Moved to sister station KVET-FM)
 Brian Matheny (Wonderboy - KASE Morning Zoo)
 Marvin Mempin
 Anna McCann
 Don Miller
 Bob Pickett (Moved to sister station KVET-FM)
 Michelle Roebuck
 Scarlett
 Heather White (Moved to sister station KVET-FM)
 Mark Williams
 John Zenor

Station management
Program Director - Jason McCollim

KASE-FM HD2/K248CU
KASE-FM HD2 launched an LGBT-oriented Dance format via translator K248CU (97.5 FM) on January 12, 2016. The format lasted until January 26, 2018, when it changed to its current Alternative Rock format as "Alt 97.5". In 2021, KASE-FM-HD2/K248CU was named as Austin FC's English-language radio broadcaster.

References

External links

Country radio stations in the United States
ASE-FM
Radio stations established in 1969
1969 establishments in Texas
IHeartMedia radio stations